John Ferguson (1756–1830) was a farmer, merchant, judge and political figure in Upper Canada. He represented Frontenac in the Legislative Assembly of Upper Canada from 1800 to 1804.

Ferguson married Helena Magdalene Johnson, the daughter of Sir William Johnson. Ferguson lived in Sidney Township and then Kingston. He served as barracks master at Oswegatche and Fort Ontario and then as commissary at Kingston. Ferguson was a colonel in the militia and then captain in the Indian Department. He also served as a justice of the peace. He was named a judge in the Midland District in 1798.

References

1756 births
1830 deaths
Members of the Legislative Assembly of Upper Canada
Judges in Ontario
People from Quinte West
Upper Canada judges